Keshavarz-e Khotbeh Sara (also Romanized as Keshāvarz-e Khoţbeh Sarā) is a village in Khotbeh Sara Rural District, Kargan Rud District, Talesh County, Gilan Province, Iran. At the 2006 census, its population was 784, in 196 families.

References 

Populated places in Talesh County